Khvajehlar-e Vosta (also Romanized as Khvājehlar-e Vosţá) is a village in Charuymaq-e Jonubesharqi Rural District, Shadian District, Charuymaq County, East Azerbaijan Province, Iran. At the 2006 census, its population was at 115, in 14 families.

References 

Populated places in Charuymaq County